Balog is a Hungarian surname of nobility, see article Balog (genus), a variant of Balogh. Notable people with the surname include:

Bob Balog (1924–2011), American football player in the National Football League
Csaba Balog (born 1972), Hungarian football (midfielder) player
James Balog (born 1952), American photographer whose work revolves around the relationship between humans and nature
Lester Balog (1905–1976), labor activist and founding member of the Workers' Film & Photo League
Marcell Balog (born 1988), Hungarian footballer
Tibor Balog (footballer, born 1963)
Tibor Balog (footballer, born 1966)
Vilmos Balog (born 1975), Hungarian boxer
Zoltán Balog (astronomer) (born 1972), astronomer with the Steward Observatory at the University of Arizona
Zoltán Balog (footballer) (born 1978), Hungarian football defender
Zoltán Balog (politician) (born 1958), Hungarian politician
Zsolt Balog (born 1978), Hungarian football (defender) player
 (1932–2014), Croatian children's fiction writer

See also
Čierny Balog, municipality in Brezno District, in the Banská Bystrica Region of central Slovakia
Balog nad Ipľom, village and municipality in the Veľký Krtíš District of the Banská Bystrica Region of southern Slovakia

Hungarian-language surnames

hu:Balog (egyértelműsítő lap)